Willy Sulzbacher (7 August 1876 – 15 August 1908) was a French fencer. He competed in the men's épée event at the 1900 Summer Olympics. Some sources, including the IOC athlete database, list him as a German competitor because he was named to the Games by Deutscher und Österreichischer Fechterbund, a German fencing club. He committed suicide by shooting himself in 1908.

References

External links
 

1876 births
1908 suicides
French male épée fencers
Olympic fencers of France
Fencers at the 1900 Summer Olympics
Sportspeople from Saint-Cloud
Suicides by firearm in France